The Fly (original title A légy) is a 1980 Hungarian animated short film. It is unrelated to the 1958 film of the same name or to its 1986 remake.

Accolades
It won the Academy Award for Best Animated Short Film at the 53rd Academy Awards.

Summary
A film without words, seen from the perspective of a fly who finds itself in a house on an autumn day.

References

External links 
 
 

1980 films
1980 animated films
1980s animated short films
Best Animated Short Academy Award winners
Animated films about insects
Animated films without speech
Hungarian animated films
Hungarian short films
Films about flies